The golden-margined hap (Otopharynx auromarginatus)  is a species of cichlid native to Lake Malawi as well as the upper Shire River.  This species can reach a length of  TL.  This species can also be found in the aquarium trade.

References

Golden-margined hap
Fish described in 1908
Taxonomy articles created by Polbot